Anne Savedge is an American photographic artist and art educator.

Education and teaching
Anne Savedge studied at James Madison University and Virginia Commonwealth University. She has taught at the Chesterfield Technical Center, John Tyler Community College, and Virginia Museum of Fine Arts.

Exhibitions
Themes and names of photographic series by Savedge include cowgirls, waterfalls, swimmers, and belly dancers. Her exhibition Shootin''' at Artspace in 2016 was based on her interest in Westerns and cowboys. Her exhibition Seasons and Gardens was shown at Artspace in 2012.

Savedge was chosen as one of the artists with over 25 years of outstanding careers for a show at the Richmond Public Library.

Collections
Virginia Museum of Fine Arts
Center for Photography at Woodstock
Taubman Museum of Art
Longwood Center for the Visual Arts
Chrysler Museum of Art

Photography
Her photographs and her quotations about photographic processes have been used in books and other publications by noted photographers and historians of photography. Her work was included in Light and Lens: Photography in the Digital Age'' by Robert J. Hirsch, pp. 256.

References

External links 
 Official site.

Living people
20th-century American photographers
21st-century American photographers
James Madison University alumni
Virginia Commonwealth University alumni
Artists from Richmond, Virginia
Year of birth missing (living people)